Motel is a Spanish rock band that originated in Castellón, Spain in 1996.

Albums

Uno (1998)
 El complicado sabor de la carne cruda (2000) 
 Veneno Stereo (2002)
 Animales de Compañía (2009) 
 Los Renglones Torcidos (2011)
 Cultivos (2015)

Reception

Mondosonoro selected Animales de Compañía as one of the best 15 records of 2009 among the Valencian community. Motel has a strong following in the underground Spanish music scene. The band has played concerts all around Spain, sharing the stage with acts such as Barricada, Los Planetas, Sôber, and Pereza.

References

http://www.nomepierdoniuna.net/motel-cosecha-sus-cultivos-rockeros/
https://web.archive.org/web/20091017215320/http://www.efeeme.com/4346/motel-rock-de-la-mejor-escuela/
http://www.efeeme.com/4238/rockola-discos-8-de-mayo-de-2009/
http://www.lasprovincias.es/prensa/20061116/ocio/motel-noche-motel-terra_20061116.html
Página oficial de la banda

Spanish rock music groups